Sakamasay is a rural municipality in southwest Madagascar. It belongs to the district of Betioky, which is a part of Atsimo-Andrefana Region.

Roads
This municipality is situated along the National road 10.

References

Populated places in Atsimo-Andrefana